An Item from the Late News (1982) is a novel by Australian author Thea Astley.

Plot summary

The narrator here is arch, sarcastic, oblique Gabby, a painter who, in reaction against her boring upper-middle family, has been through marriage, affairs, bohemianism, and a breakdown..Now, back in her home-town of Allbut, a former mining center that's become a near-ghost town ""in our continental funkerama,"" Gabby is oddly entranced by a newcomer named Wafer--an overage hippie whose only goal is to find ""the perfect bomb shelter."" (His father was a WW II bomb fatality; he's obsessed with Hiroshima.) But Wafer's quiet quest on the town's outskirts will be doomed--by the town's greed and hypocrisy and violence, by Gabby's own self-involved apathy: Wafer is terrorized by a local macho-thug; his fatherly affection for a teenage girl (the thug's rape victim) is used against him. And when Wafer happens to find a precious stone on one of his wanderings, the town will stop at nothing to learn the location of this possible new gem-lode. . . with a predictably fatal outcome.

Reviews

 Kirkus Reviews: "As in her previous work, Astley is romanticizing the misfit/outcast here--especially when she drops allusions along the way that suggest Wafer/Christ parallels. And Gabby's narration, though dotted with sparks of rough poetry and sardonic comedy, is too often self-consciously slangy or artsy. Still, adventurous readers may want to tackle this dense socio-philosophical fable--for its undeniable intensity, for the moments when Astley's lashing prose is controlled enough to produce grimly atmospheric or bitterly humorous effects."
 Marian Eldridge in The Canberra Times: "All in all, though, 'An Item From the Late News' works only too well. It is not a pretty story, not an optimistic one, but in today's world horribly pertinent, and always readable."

References

External links
Middlemiss.org

1982 Australian novels
Novels by Thea Astley